"World Machine" is a song written by Wally Badarou, Phil Gould, Mark King and Mike Lindup that became the title track of British musical group Level 42's sixth studio album.  A remix of the song by Shep Pettibone was released as a 12-inch single in the U.S. in 1986 and peaked at number 25 on Billboard magazine's Hot Dance/Disco – Club Play in 1987.

Critical reception
The review of the 12-inch single remix in Billboard read, "Pulsating electrojazz cut, much requested earlier this year as an album track, newly remixed for club impact." In his review of the World Machine album for Rolling Stone, Steve Bloom wrote that the title track was "their best effort: propelled by Phil Gould's explosive tribal beat, it showcases Mike Lindup's considerable keyboard talents." William Cooper's retrospective review of the album for AllMusic noted, "The jazzy, upbeat title track is one of the band's finest moments."

Track listing
12-inch single
 "World Machine (Remix)" – 5:39
 "World Machine (Dub)" – 7:24

Personnel
Credits adapted from the liner notes for the ''World Machine'’ album:

Level 42
 Mark King – bass, vocals
 Mike Lindup – keyboards, vocals
 Phil Gould – drums
 Boon Gould – guitars
Additional musicians
 Wally Badarou – Synclavier, additional vocals
 Gary Barnacle – saxophone

Production
 Level 42 – producers
 Wally Badarou – producer 
 Julian Mendelsohn – production assistant, recording
 Shep Pettibone – remixing

References

Bibliography

External links
World Machine (Shep Pettibone Remix)

Level 42 songs
1985 songs
Songs written by Wally Badarou
Songs written by Mark King (musician)
Songs written by Mike Lindup
Songs written by Phil Gould (musician)